The Kaniere River is a river of New Zealand. It is located in the West Coast Region of the South Island. The river is the outflow of Lake Kaniere, and flows west to reach the Hokitika River five kilometres from the coast of the Tasman Sea.

See also
List of rivers of New Zealand

References

Rivers of the West Coast, New Zealand
Rivers of New Zealand